Shema may refer to:

Shema Yisrael, a Jewish prayer
Shema, variant name for Shama, Ghana
Shema, videogame character in Quest for Glory
Ibrahim Shema, Nigerian lawyer and politician

See also
Shima (disambiguation)
Shama (disambiguation)
Shemaiah (disambiguation)
Shim'a